Alisanos (Latinized as Alisaunus) was a local Gallo-Roman god worshipped in what is now the Côte-d'Or in Burgundy and at Aix-en-Provence.

Name 
The Gaulish theonym Alisanos is generally derived from the word alisia, meaning either 'rock, boulder' (cf. Old Irish ail) or 'whitebeam' (cf. French alisier), which is also found in the toponym Alesia. Miranda Green interpreted Alisanos as a mountain-god. Alternatively, the stem Alisa- has been phonologically compared to the Proto-Celtic noun *alisā, meaning 'alder'.

Attestations 
The inscription from Gevrey-Chambertin in the Côte-d'Or is in the Gaulish language:

DOIROS SEGOMARI
IEVRV ALISANV
Doiros (son) of Segomaros has dedicated (this) to Alisanos

The inscription from Visignot, also in the Côte-d'Or, is in Latin:

DEO·ALISANO·PAVLLINVS ❧
PRO·CONTEDIO·FIL·SVO ❧
V·S·L·M·
Paullinus has freely and deservedly fulfilled his vow to the god Alisanus on behalf of his son Contedius

References 

Bibliography

Gaulish gods
Mountain gods